The flag of the Marquesas Islands is the flag chosen by the regional government to represent the islands. However, it is not formally recognized by France, the administrative government of the region.

Description 
The flag is divided into two horizontal stripes with yellow on top and red on bottom, with a white equilateral triangle emerging from the hoist. The yellow represents youth and joy, while the red and white are tapu, or sacred, to the chiefs and priests respectively.

In the white triangle, a black design of Matatiki ("the gaze of Tiki") represents the first man in Polynesian mythology, and the inventor of sculpture and tattooing. The tattoo design on Tiki's cheeks are tapu symbols.

History 
The first version of the flag was revealed December 30, 1978 by the Motu Haka Association. The flag was formally adopted by the local government on November 30, 1998. The flag was used informally for many years, having been first raised on December 14, 1980, at the opening of the airport on Nuku Hiva.

The design of Matatiki has appeared in several versions throughout the years. The design was most recently updated in 2017 by Teiki Huukena, a Marquesas Island tattoo artist.

Other flags of the Marquesas Islands

Flag of France 

The flag of France is the only ensign officially recognized by the French government to represent the Marquesas Islands.

Flag of French Polynesia 

The overseas country which Marquesas Islands are a part of also has its own flag. It was adopted by the regional government in 1984.

Kingdom of Nuku Hiva Flag 
On June 1, 1835, French nobleman Baron de Thierry declared himself king of Nuku Hiva, the largest island of the Marquesas. The so-called kingdom was never formalized in any way and Thierry left the island shortly after. A design associated with this Thierry's claim has appeared in publications and throughout the internet, but its origin and connection to the historical incident remain unverified.

References

Flag
French
Marquesan culture
Marquesas Islands
Marquesas
Marquesas Islands